The Ansei great earthquakes (安政の大地震, Ansei no Dai Jishin) were a series of major earthquakes that struck Japan during the Ansei era (1854–1860):

 The Ansei Tōkai quake was an 8.4 magnitude earthquake which struck on December 23, 1854. The epicenter ranged from Suruga Bay to the deep ocean, and struck primarily in the Tōkai region, but destroyed houses as far away as in Edo. The subsequent tsunami caused damage along the entire coast from the Bōsō Peninsula in modern-day Chiba prefecture to Tosa province (modern-day Kōchi Prefecture)
 The Ansei Nankai quake was an 8.4 magnitude earthquake which struck on December 24, 1854. Over 10,000 people from the Tōkai region down to Kyushu were killed.
 The  was an M7.4 intra-plate earthquake in Hōyo Strait affecting Kyushu and Shikoku on December 26, 1854. It affected nearby area more than the two megathrust earthquake that happened in the previous few days.
 The Ansei Edo quake was a Ms 7.0 earthquake which struck Edo (modern-day Tokyo) on November 11, 1855. ~120 earthquakes and tremors in total were felt in Edo in 1854-55. The great earthquake struck after 10 p.m.; roughly 30 aftershocks continued until dawn. The epicenter was near the mouth of the Arakawa River. Records from the time indicate 6,641 deaths inside the city, and 2,759 injuries; much of the city was destroyed by fire, leading many people to stay in rural inns. Aftershocks continued for ~20. This quake was a particularly destructive deep thrust quake caused by a giant slab of rock stuck between the Philippine Sea Plate and the Pacific Plate.

The earthquakes were blamed on a giant catfish (Namazu) thrashing about. Ukiyo-e prints depicting namazu became very popular around this time.

Other notable quakes 
1854 Iga-Ueno earthquake, one which registered 7.4 on the Richter scale and struck the Kansai region.

An  was estimated to be a megathrust earthquake with Magnitude 7-8, with tsunami recorded, however damage was relatively few. 

The 1858 Hietsu earthquake struck Hida Province (modern-day Gifu Prefecture) on April 9, 1858.

See also
 List of earthquakes in Japan
 List of historical tsunamis

Notes

References
 
 

1850s in Japan
Tsunamis in Japan
1854 earthquakes
1855 earthquakes
1854 tsunamis
1855 tsunamis
Bakumatsu
Earthquake clusters, swarms, and sequences
Earthquakes of the Edo period